Comte. Ariston Pessoa Regional Airport , is the airport serving Jijoca de Jericoacoara, Brazil, located in the adjoining municipality of Cruz.

It is administrated by Socicam.

History
The airport was commissioned on June 24, 2017.

Airlines and destinations

Access

See also

List of airports in Brazil

References

External links

Airports in Ceará
Airports established in 2017
2017 establishments in Brazil